Room Service is a farce written by Allen Boretz and John Murray. It was originally produced by George Abbott and debuted at the Cort Theatre in New York City on May 19, 1937.  Its initial production ran for 500 performances, closing on July 16, 1938. The play, starring Jack Lemmon in the role of Leo Davis was revived on Broadway for a short run of 16 performances in 1953.

RKO Pictures purchased the film rights for a then-record $225,000 and used it as the basis for the Marx Brothers film of the same title. In 1944 RKO released a further film adaptation, a musical entitled Step Lively starring Frank Sinatra.

The 1937 original Broadway production starred Sam Levene as Gordon Miller, Eddie Albert as Leo Davis and Phillip Loeb as Harry Binion.

Original 1937–38 Broadway cast

Reprised the role in the film adaptation.

In popular culture
The basic plot of Room Service was used for the "Monkees, Manhattan Style" episode of The Monkees (season 1, episode 30, first broadcast April 10, 1967, also known as "Monkees in Manhattan").

References

External links

Room Service at the Internet Broadway Database

1937 plays
Broadway plays
American plays adapted into films
Plays set in New York City
Works set in hotels